This is a list of people who have taught or studied at the University of Göttingen:

Natural sciences and mathematics
Wilhelm Ackermann — Mathematics
Heinrich Behmann — Mathematical Logic
Paul Bernays — Mathematics, mathematical logic — (Student, later Professor extraordinarius)
Patrick Blackett — Physics — Nobel Prize in Physics 1948
Johann Friedrich Blumenbach— comparative anatomy
Max Born — Mathematical Physics — (Professor ordinarius) — (1882–1970, in Göttingen 1921–1933) — Nobel Prize in Physics 1954
Walther Bothe — Physics — Nobel Prize in Physics 1954 together with Max Born
Michael Buback — Chemistry
Adolf Butenandt — Chemistry — Nobel Prize in Chemistry 1939
Moritz Benedikt Cantor — Mathematics
Constantin Carathéodory — Mathematics
Alonzo Church —  Mathematical Logic (Postdoc)
Richard Courant — Mathematics
Haskell Curry — Mathematical Logic (Postdoc)
Peter Debye — Mathematical Physics — (Professor ordinarius) — (1884–1966, in Göttingen 1914–1920) — Nobel Prize in Chemistry 1936
Richard Dedekind — Mathematics
Jacob Pieter Den Hartog — Fluid Mechanics
Gottlob Frege — Mathematical Logic
Hans Georg Dehmelt — Nobel Prize in Physics 1989
Max Delbrück — Astronomy, Physics — Nobel Prize in Medicine 1969
Paul Dirac — Physics — Nobel Prize in Physics 1933 (with Erwin Schrödinger)
Peter Gustav Lejeune Dirichlet — Mathematics
Manfred Eigen — Biophysical Chemistry — Nobel Prize in Chemistry 1967 (with Ronald G. W. Norrish and George Porter)
Albert Einstein — Physics — Nobel Prize in Physics 1921 — (Guest lecturer, 1915)
Heinz Ellenberg — Biology, Botany — (Professor ordinarius) (1913–1997, in Göttingen 1966–1981 emeritus)
William Feller — Mathematics
James Franck — Physics — Nobel Prize in Physics 1925 (with Gustav Hertz)
Enrico Fermi — Physics — Nobel Prize in Physics 1938
Lazarus Immanuel Fuchs — Mathematics
Carl Friedrich Gauß — Astronomy, geodesy, mathematics, physics — (Professor ordinarius for astronomy)
Gerhard Gentzen — Mathematics
Kurt Gödel — Mathematical logic — (Guest lecturer, 1939)
Maria Goeppert-Mayer — Physics — Nobel Prize in Physics 1963
Hans Grauert — Mathematics
August Grisebach — Botany
Alfréd Haar — Mathematics
Otto Hahn — Chemistry — Nobel Prize in Chemistry 1944
Georg Hamel — Mathematics
Georg Cantor — Mathematics
Robert Oppenheimer — Physics (Ph.D.)
Klaus Hasselmann — Physics — Nobel Prize in Physics 2021
Herbert Hawkes — Mathematics
Stefan W. Hell — Nobel Prize in Chemistry 2014
Walter Norman Haworth — Chemistry — Nobel Prize in Chemistry 1937
Helmut Hasse — Mathematics
Heinrich Heesch — Mathematics
Andreas J. Heinrich — Physics
Werner Heisenberg — Physics — (Professor ordinarius) — Nobel Prize in Physics 1932
Ernst Hellinger — Mathematics
Gerhard Herzberg — Chemistry — Nobel Prize in Chemistry 1971
David Hilbert — Mathematics — (Professor ordinarius)
Heinz Hopf — Mathematics
Friedrich Hund — Mathematics
Ernst Ising — Mathematics
Abraham Gotthelf Kästner — Mathematics
Felix Klein — Mathematics
Carl Koldewey — Mathematics
Herbert Kroemer — Physics — Nobel Prize in Physics 2000
Wolfgang Krull — Mathematics
Heinrich Gerhard Kuhn — Physics
Edmund Landau — Mathematics
Dieter Langbein — Theoretical physics
Irving Langmuir — Chemistry — Nobel Prize in Chemistry 1932
Max von Laue — Physics — Nobel Prize in Physics 1914
August Treboniu Laurian — Mathematics, Physics, founding member of the Romanian Academy and leader of the 1848 Revolution in Transylvania
Georg Christoph Lichtenberg — Physics, Mathematics, Astronomy — (Student) — (Professor ordinarius)
Saunders Mac Lane — Mathematics
Tobias Mayer — Mathematics
Robert Andrews Millikan — Physics — Nobel Prize in Physics 1923
Hermann Minkowski — Mathematics
Leonard Nelson — Mathematics
Walther Nernst — Physical Chemistry — Nobel Prize in Chemistry 1920
John von Neumann — Physics, Computer Science (Postdoc)
Albert Niemann — First man to synthesize cocaine
Emmy Noether — Mathematics
Robert Oppenheimer — Physics (Ph.D.)
Peter Simon Pallas — Zoology, Botany — (Student)
Wolfgang Pauli — Physics — Nobel Prize in Physics 1945
Wilhelm Pfeffer — Botany — (Student)
Max Planck — Physics — Nobel Prize in Physics 1918
Ludwig Prandtl — Physics — (Professor ordinarius)
Richard Rado — Mathematics
Johann Radon — Mathematics
Kurt Reidemeister — Mathematics
Theodore William Richards — Chemistry — Nobel Prize in Chemistry 1914
Frigyes Riesz — Mathematics
Bernhard Riemann — Mathematics — (Professor ordinarius)
Walther Ritz — Mathematics
Carl Runge — Mathematics
Wolfgang Sartorius von Waltershausen — Geology
Friedrich Schlegel
August Wilhelm Schlegel
Arthur Moritz Schönflies — Mathematics
Moses Schönfinkel — Mathematical Logic
Hermann Amandus Schwarz — Mathematics
Carl Ludwig Siegel — Mathematics — (Professor ordinarius)
Hertha Sponer — Physics
Moritz Abraham Stern — Mathematics — (Professor ordinarius)
Otto Stern — Physics — Nobel Prize in Physics 1943
Gabriel Sudan — Mathematics
Thoralf Skolem — Mathematics, mathematical logic — (Guest researcher)
Thomas A. Steitz — Nobel Prize in Chemistry 2009
Gustav Tammann — Inorganic and Physical Chemistry
Oswald Teichmüller — Mathematics
Edward Teller — Physics
Le Van Thiem — Mathematics
Otto Toeplitz — Mathematics
Johann Georg Tralles — Mathematics
Otto Wallach — Chemistry — Nobel Prize in Chemistry 1910
Bartel Leendert van der Waerden — Mathematics
Arnold Walfisz — Mathematics
Wilhelm Weber — Physics — (Professor ordinarius)
Julius Weisbach — Mathematics
Hermann Weyl — Mathematics
Eugene Paul Wigner — Physics — Nobel Prize in Physics 1963
Wilhelm Wien — (Student) — Nobel Prize in Physics 1911
Norbert Wiener — Mathematics
Adolf Windaus — Chemistry — Nobel Prize in Chemistry 1928
Friedrich Wöhler — Chemistry, Pharmacy — (Professor ordinarius)
Ernst Zermelo — Mathematics
Richard Adolf Zsigmondy — Chemistry — Nobel Prize in Chemistry 1925

Law, economics and social sciences
Marlina Flassy  — Anthropology, first woman Dean at Cenderawasih University.
Karl Heinrich Ulrichs — Law and Theology, pioneer of the gay rights movement
Dieter Bohlen — Economics — (Student)
Zhu De — (Student, 1922–1925) — Cofounder of the People's Liberation Army of China
Georg Diederichs — Law, Economics, Pharmacy — (Student)
Georg Ebers — Law (later famous Egyptologist) — (Student)
 Manolache Costache Epureanu — Law, (Prime Minister of Romania in 1870 and in 1876)
Heinrich Heine — Law — (Student, Ph.D.)
Klaus Kleinfeld — Business Administration — (Student)
Hinrich Wilhelm Kopf — Law and Administrative Sciences — (Student)
Georg Michaelis — Law — (Ph.D.)
Nicolae Mișu — (Ph.D. Law, Minister of Foreign Affairs of Romania in 1919)
John Pierpont Morgan — (Student)
Lassa Oppenheim — Law — (Ph.D.)
Andreas Paulus — Law — (Professor, Judge of the Federal Constitutional Court of Federal Republic of Germany)
Helmuth Plessner — (Professor and university president)
Ingrid Robeyns — Economics — (student)
Claus Roxin  — Law —  (Professor ordinarius1963–1971)
Johann Stephan Pütter  — Law —  (Professor ordinarius)
Georg Friedrich Sartorius (von Waltershausen) — Economics and History
Edzard Schmidt-Jortzig — Law — (scientific Assistant, Habilitand)
Percy Ernst Schramm — History — (Professor 1929–1963)
Gerhard Schröder — Law — (Student, AStA-Chairman, Honorary Ph.D. of Natural Sciences) — former chancellor of Germany
Joseph J. Sherman — Social Sciences  — (Student) — Artist
Bassam Tibi — International Relations — (Professor ordinarius)
Jürgen Trittin — Social Sciences — (Student, AStA-Member)
Rudolf von Bennigsen — Law — (Student)
Otto von Bismarck — Law — (Student) — iron chancellor of the second German Empire
Wilhelm von Bode — Law, Arts — (Student)
Gustav von Hugo — Law — (Student) — (Professor ordinarius)
Rudolf von Jhering — Law — (Student) — (Professor ordinarius)
Friedrich Carl von Savigny — Law — (Student)
Fritz-Dietlof von der Schulenburg — Law (Victim of 20 July 1944) — (Student)
Heinrich Friedrich Karl Freiherr vom Stein — Law — (Student, 1773–1777)
Richard von Weizsäcker — History, Law — (Student, Ph.D.) — former President of Germany
Hans Julius Wolff — Law — (Ph.D.)

Humanities and theology
Heinrich Brugsch — Egyptology — (Professor ordinarius) — (1827–1894, in Göttingen 1868–1870)
Georg Bühler — Scholar of Indian languages and law
Alexander Conze — Archaeology — (Student, Privatdozent)
Karl Deichgräber — Philology — (Student, Professor)
Rudolf Eucken — Philosopher — (Student) — Nobel Prize in Literature 1908
Heinrich Ewald — Theology, Orientalistic — (Student) — (Professor ordinarius)
Johann Nikolaus Forkel — Law, Music (Student, Professor, Music director)
Sigmar Gabriel — Teaching German, Sociology, Politics — (Student)
Basil Lanneau Gildersleeve —  American Classicist
Günter Grass — Nobel Prize in Literature 1999
Jonas Grethlein, German classicist
Georg Friedrich Grotefend — Philology — Decipherer of Cuneiform script
Jacob Grimm — Linguistics and History of Literature — (Professor ordinarius, Bibliothekar)
Wilhelm Grimm — Linguistics and History of Literature — (Professor ordinarius, Bibliothekar)
Jürgen Habermas
Rebekka Habermas, modern history
Nicolai Hartmann — Philosophy — (Professor)
Johann Friedrich Herbart — Philosophy, Pedagogy, Psychology; — (Professor)
Christian Gottlob Heyne — Linguistics and History, Archaeology — (Professor ordinarius)
Edmund Husserl — Philosophy
Nae Ionescu — Philosophy — (Student)
Charles W. Kent — Literature — student
Walther Killy — Literature — Rector 1967–68
Reinhard Gregor Kratz, biblical scholar, historian of ancient Judaism
Philip G. Kreyenbroek, Iranist, known for his studies on Yazidi culture
August Leskien — Linguistics — (Professor extraordinarius)
Gustav Meyer — Linguistics — (Assistant and later Professor)
Adolf Muschg — Germanistics — (Assistant)
Ludwig Quidde — History, Philosophy, Economics — (Student) — Nobel Peace Prize 1927 (with Ferdinand Buisson)
Eva Rieger — Musicology
Dorothea von Rodde-Schlözer (1770 to 1825) Doctor of Philosophy. The first woman to be awarded a higher degree in Germany.
Waldemar R. Röhrbein (1935–2014), history 
Ji Xianlin Linguist; (Phd student, Assistant)
Arthur Schopenhauer
Kurt Sethe — Egyptology — (Professor ordinarius)
Hermann Spieckermann, biblical scholar, historian of ancient Near Eastern religion
Philipp Albert Stapfer — Theology — (Student)
Friedrich Bouterwek — Philosopher — (Professor)
Max Weber
Julius Wellhausen— Biblical scholar and orientalist — (Professor)
Hermann von Grauert — History — (Student)
John Sadananda, Old Testament Scholar and Master of the Senate of Serampore College (University), India

Medicine
Gottlieb Burckhardt — Medicine (psychiatry) — (Student) — first physician to perform modern psychosurgery (1888)
Max Delbrück — Medicine — Nobel Prize in Medicine 1969
Paul Ehrlich — Professor ordinarius (1904–1914) — Nobel Prize in Medicine 1908 (with Ilya Ilyich Mechnikov)
Albrecht von Haller, Professor of Anatomy, Botanics and Surgery, (1708–1777, in Göttingen 1736–1753)
Robert Koch — Medicine — (Student and Ph.D. in Göttingen) — Nobel Prize in Medicine 1905
Hans Adolf Krebs — Medicine — (Student) — Nobel Prize in Medicine 1953
Ilya Ilyich Mechnikov, Studies in Göttingen — Nobel Prize in Medicine 1908 (with Paul Ehrlich)
Erwin Neher — Medicine — Nobel Prize in Medicine 1991 (with Bert Sakmann)
Thomas Young, Medicine, Physics, Linguistics (Ph.D. in Medicine)

List of Nobel prize winners

To date, 45 Nobel Prize laureates have studied, taught or made contributions here. Most of these prizes were given in the first half of the 20th century, which was called the "Göttingen Nobel prize wonder".

Other

 John T. Dorrance (1873–1930), inventor of Campbell's soup
 George Hanger, 4th Baron Coleraine (1751–1824), soldier, author and eccentric
 Otto Ohlendorf (1907–1951), SS general and Holocaust perpetrator, executed for war crimes
 Erich Roth (1910–1947), Nazi Gestapo member executed for war crimes
 Uwe Wolf (born 1961), musicologist

References 

Gottingen
University of Göttingen